Edouard Duvigneaud of Belgium was the National Commissioner of the Dutch-speaking Vlaamsch Verbond der Katholieke Scouts from 1956 and as a member of the World Scout Committee.

Duvigneaud performed the closing ceremony of the 1977 Irish Scout Jamboree.

Year of birth missing
Scouting and Guiding in Belgium
World Scout Committee members